Jeff Cross may refer to:
 Jeff Cross (American football) (born 1966), former professional football player in the NFL
 Jeff Cross (baseball) (1918–1997), professional baseball player in MLB
 Jeff Cross (basketball) (born 1961), former professional basketball player in the NBA
 Jeff Cross (1923–2016), inductee of the Canadian Soccer Hall of Fame

See also
 Geoffrey Cross, Baron Cross of Chelsea, British judge
 Jeffrey Cross, aka OG Loc, a character in Grand Theft Auto: San Andreas